Semniomima ligatalis is a moth in the family Crambidae first described by Herbert Druce in 1895. It is found in Veracruz, Mexico.

References

Moths described in 1895
Pyraustinae